Turkish Cypriots or Cypriot Turks ( or Kıbrıslı Türkler) are ethnic Turks originating from Cyprus. Following the Ottoman conquest of the island in 1571, about 30,000 Turkish settlers were given land once they arrived in Cyprus. Additionally, many of the island's local Christians converted to Islam during the early years of Ottoman rule. Nonetheless, the influx of mainly Muslim settlers to Cyprus continued intermittently until the end of the Ottoman period. Today, while Northern Cyprus is home to a significant part of the Turkish Cypriot population, the majority of Turkish Cypriots live abroad, forming the Turkish Cypriot diaspora. This diaspora came into existence after the Ottoman Empire transferred the control of the island to the British Empire, as many Turkish Cypriots emigrated primarily to Turkey and the United Kingdom for political and economic reasons. 

Standard Turkish is the official language of Northern Cyprus. The vernacular spoken by Turkish Cypriots is Cypriot Turkish, which has been influenced by Cypriot Greek as well as English.

History

Pre-Ottoman Cyprus
Although there was no settled Muslim population in Cyprus prior to the Ottoman conquest of 1570–71, some Ottoman Turks were captured and 
carried off as prisoners to Cyprus in the year 1400 during Cypriot raids in the Asiatic and Egyptian coasts. Some of these captives accepted or were forced to convert to Christianity and were baptized; however, there were also some Turkish slaves who remained unbaptized. By 1425, some of these slaves helped the Mamluke army to gain access to Limassol Castle. Despite the release of some of the captives, after the payment of ransoms, most of the baptized Turks continued to remain on the island. The medieval Cypriot historian Leontios Machairas recalled that the baptized Turks were not permitted to leave Nicosia when the Mamlukes approached the city after the battle of Khirokitia in 1426. According to Professor Charles Fraser Beckingham, "there must therefore have been some Cypriots, at least nominally Christian, who were of Turkish, Arab, or Egyptian origin."

By 1488, the Ottomans made their first attempt at conquering Cyprus when Sultan Bayezid II sent a fleet to conquer Famagusta. However, the attempt failed due to the timely intervention of a Venetian fleet. The Queen of Cyprus, Caterina Cornaro, was forced to relinquish her crown to the Republic of Venice in 1489. In the same year, Ottoman ships were seen off the coast of Karpas and the Venetians began to strengthen the fortifications of the island. By 1500, coastal raids by Ottoman vessels resulted in the heavy loss of Venetian fleets, forcing Venice to negotiate a peace treaty with the Ottoman Empire in 1503. However, by May 1539 Suleiman I decided to attack Limassol because the Venetians had been sheltering pirates who continuously attacked Ottoman ships. Limassol stayed under Ottoman control until a peace treaty was signed in 1540. Cyprus continued to be a haven for pirates who interrupted the safe passage of Ottoman trade ships and Muslim pilgrims sailing to Mecca and Medina. By 1569, pirates captured the Ottoman defterdar (treasurer) of Egypt, and Selim II decided to safeguard the sea route from Constantinople to Alexandria by conquering the island and clearing the eastern Mediterranean of all enemies in 1570–71.

Ottoman Cyprus

The basis for the emergence of a sizeable and enduring Turkish community in Cyprus emerged when Ottoman troops landed on the island in mid-May 1570 and seized it within a year from Venetian rule. The post-conquest period established a significant Muslim community which consisted of soldiers from the campaign who remained behind and further settlers who were brought from Anatolia as part of a traditional Ottoman population policy. There were also new converts to Islam on the island during the early years of Ottoman rule.

In addition to documented settlement of Anatolian peasants and craftsmen, as well as the arrival of soldiers, decrees were also issued banishing Anatolian tribes, "undesirable" persons, and members of various "troublesome" Muslim sects, principally those officially classified as heretical. This influx of mainly Muslim settlers to Cyprus continued intermittently until the end of the Ottoman period.

Some Turkish Cypriots are descendants of Crypto-Christians, a phenomenon that was not uncommon in the Ottoman Empire given its multi-faith character. In Cyprus, many Latins and Maronites, as well as Greeks, converted to Islam at different points during Ottoman rule for a number of reasons ranging from collectively avoiding heavy taxation to ending an individual woman unhappy marriage. Their artificial embrace of Islam and their secret maintaining of Christianity led this group of crypto-Christians to be known in Greek as 'Linobamvaki' or the cotton-linen sect as they changed religion to curry favour with Ottoman officials during the day but practiced Catholicism at night. In 1636 the conditions for the Christians became intolerable and certain Christians decided to become Muslims. According to Palmieri (1905) the Maronites who became Muslims lived mainly in the Nicosia District and despite the fact that the Maronites turned to Muslims they never gave up their Christian faith and beliefs hoping to become Christians. This is why they baptized their children according to the Christian faith, but they also practiced circumcision. They also gave their children two names, a Muslim and a Christian one. Many of the villages and neighbouring areas accepted as Turkish Cypriot estates, were formerly Linobambaki activity centers. These include:

By the second quarter of the nineteenth century, approximately 30,000 Muslims were living in Cyprus, comprising about 35% of the total population. The fact that Turkish was the main language spoken by the Muslims of the island is a significant indicator that the majority of them were either Turkish-speaking Anatolians or otherwise from a Turkic background. Throughout the Ottoman rule, the demographic ratio between Christian "Greeks" and Muslim "Turks" fluctuated constantly. During 1745–1814, the Muslim Turkish Cypriots constituted the majority on the island compared to the Christian Greek Cypriots, being up to 75% of the total island population. However, by 1841, Turks made up 27% of the island's population. One of the reasons for this decline is because the Turkish community were obliged to serve in the Ottoman army for years, usually away from home, very often losing their lives in the endless wars of the Ottoman Empire. Another reason for the declining population was because of the emigration trend of some 15,000 Turkish Cypriots to Anatolia in 1878, when the Ottoman Turks handed over the administration of the island to Britain.

British Cyprus

By 1878, during the Congress of Berlin, under the terms of the Anglo-Ottoman Cyprus Convention, the Ottoman Turks had agreed to assign Cyprus to Britain to occupy and rule, though not to possess as sovereign territory. According to the first British census of Cyprus, in 1881, 95% of the island's Muslims spoke Turkish as their mother tongue. As of the 1920s, the percentage of Greek-speaking Muslims had dropped from 5%, in 1881, to just under 2% of the total Muslim population. During the opening years of the twentieth century Ottomanism became an ever more popular identity held by the Cypriot Muslim intelligentsia, especially in the wake of the Young Turk Revolution of 1908. Increasing numbers of Young Turks who had turned against Sultan Abdul Hamid II sought refuge in Cyprus. A rising class of disgruntled intellectuals in the island's main urban centres gradually began to warm to the ideas of positivism, freedom and modernization. Spurred on by the rising calls for "enosis", the union with Greece, emanating from Greek Cypriots, an initially hesitant "Turkism" was also starting to appear in certain newspaper articles and to be heard in the political debates of the local intelligentsia of Cyprus. In line with the changes introduced in the Ottoman Empire after 1908, the curricula of Cyprus's Muslim schools, such as the "Idadi", were also altered to incorporate more secular teachings with increasingly Turkish nationalist undertones. Many of these graduates in due course ended up as teachers in the growing number of urban and rural schools that had begun to proliferate across the island by the 1920s.

In 1914 the Ottoman Empire joined the First World War against the Allied Forces and Britain annexed the island. Cyprus's Muslim inhabitants were officially asked to choose between adopting either British nationality or retaining their Ottoman subject status; about 4,000–8,500 Muslims decided to leave the island and move to Turkey. Following its defeat in World War I, the Ottoman Empire were faced with the Greco-Turkish War (1919–1922) whereby the Greek incursion into Anatolia aimed at claiming what Greece believed to be historically Greek territory. For the Ottoman Turks of Cyprus, already fearing the aims of enosis-seeking Greek Cypriots, reports of atrocities committed by the Greeks against the Turkish populations in Anatolia, and the Greek Occupation of Smyrna, produced further fears for their own future. Greek forces were routed in 1922 under the leadership of Mustafa Kemal Atatürk who, in 1923, proclaimed the new Republic of Turkey and renounced irredentist claims to former Ottoman territories beyond the Anatolian heartland. Muslims in Cyprus were thus excluded from the nation-building project, though many still heeded Atatürk's call to join in the establishment of the new nation-state, and opted for Turkish citizenship. Between 1881 and 1927 approximately 30,000 Turkish Cypriots emigrated to Turkey.

The 1920s was to prove a critical decade in terms of stricter ethno-religious compartments; hence, Muslim Cypriots who remained on the island gradually embraced the ideology of Turkish nationalism due to the impact of the Kemalist Revolution. At its core were the Kemalist values of secularism, modernization and westernization; reforms such as the introduction of the new Turkish alphabet, adoption of western dress and secularization, were adopted voluntarily by Muslim Turkish Cypriots, who had been prepared for such changes not just by the Tanzimat but also by several decades of British rule. Many of those Cypriots who until then had still identified themselves primarily as Muslims began now to see themselves principally as Turks in Cyprus.

By 1950, a Cypriot Enosis referendum in which 95.7% of Greek Cypriot voters supported a fight aimed at enosis, the union of Cyprus with Greece were led by an armed organisation, in 1955, called EOKA by Georgios Grivas which aimed at bringing down British rule and uniting the island of Cyprus with Greece. Turkish Cypriots had always reacted immediately against the objective of enosis; thus, the 1950s saw many Turkish Cypriots who were forced to flee from their homes. In 1958, Turkish Cypriots set up their own armed group called Turkish Resistance Organisation (TMT) and by early 1958, the first wave of armed conflict between the two communities began; a few hundred Turkish Cypriots left their villages and quarters in the mixed towns and never returned.

Republic of Cyprus

By 16 August 1960 the island of Cyprus became an independent state, the Republic of Cyprus, with power sharing between the two communities under the 1960 Zurich agreements, with Britain, Greece and Turkey as Guarantor Powers. Archbishop Makarios III was elected as president by the Greek Cypriots and Dr. Fazıl Küçük was elected as vice-president by the Turkish Cypriots. However, in December 1963, in the events known as "Bloody Christmas", when Makarios III attempted to modify the Constitution, Greek Cypriots initiated a military campaign against the Turkish Cypriots and began to attack Turkish inhabited villages; by early 1964, the Turkish Cypriots started to withdraw into armed enclaves where the Greek Cypriots blockaded them, resulting in some 25,000 Turkish Cypriots becoming refugees, or internally "displaced persons". This resulted in the UN peacekeeping force, UNFICYP, being stationed on the island as well as an external migration trend of thousands more Turkish Cypriots to the United Kingdom, Turkey, North America and Australia. With the rise to power of the Greek military junta, a decade later, in 1974, a group of right-wing Greek nationalists, EOKA B, who supported the union of Cyprus with Greece,launched a putsch. This action precipitated the Turkish invasion of Cyprus, which led to the capture of the present-day territory of Northern Cyprus the following month, after a ceasefire collapsed. The Turkish invasion resulted in the occupation of some 37% of the island in the north. During the invasion of the island, a number of atrocities against the Turkish Cypriot community were committed; such as the Maratha, Santalaris and Aloda massacre by the Greek Cypriot paramilitary organisation EOKA B. After the Turkish invasion and the ensuing 1975 Vienna agreements, 60,000 Turkish Cypriots who lived in the south of the island fled to the north. The 1974–1975 movement was strictly organised by the Provisional Turkish Administration who tried to preserve village communities intact.

Turkish Republic of Northern Cyprus

In 1983 the Turkish Cypriots declared their own state in the north, the Turkish Republic of Northern Cyprus, which remains internationally unrecognised, except by Turkey. In 2004, a referendum for the unification of the island, the "Annan Plan", was accepted by 65% of Turkish Cypriots but rejected by 76% of Greek Cypriots.

Culture

The Turkish Cypriots are Turkish-speaking, regard themselves as secular Muslims, and take pride in their Ottoman heritage. However, Turkish Cypriots differentiate themselves from mainlanders, especially from the religiously conservative settlers who have come to Cyprus more recently, but their strong connection to Turkey is nonetheless undisputed. Hence, the Turkish Cypriot identity is based on their ethnic Turkish roots and links to mainland Turkey, but also to their Cypriot character with cultural and linguistic similarities with Greek Cypriots. Their culture is heavily based on family ties linked to parents, siblings, and relatives; one's neighbourhood is also considered important as emphasis is given on helping those in need. Thus, much of their lives revolves around social activities, and food is a central feature of gatherings. Turkish Cypriot folk dances, music, and art are also integral parts of their culture.

Religion

The majority of Turkish Cypriots (99%) are Sunni Muslims. However, the secularizing force of Kemalism has also exerted an impact on Turkish Cypriots. Religious practices are considered a matter of individual choice and many do not actively practice their religion. Alcohol is frequently consumed within the community and most Turkish Cypriot women do not cover their heads. Turkish Cypriot males are generally circumcised at a young age in accordance with religious beliefs, although, this practice appears more related to custom and tradition than to powerful religious motivation.

The social/religious phenomenon of crypto-Christianity was observed in Cyprus, as in other parts of the Ottoman Empire. The crypto-Christians of Cyprus were known as Linobambaki (= of linen and cotton). They are mentioned by foreign travellers as Turks who are secretly Greeks, observing the Greek Orthodox fasting (Turner 1815), drinking wine, eating pork and often taking Christian wives.

Language

The Turkish language was introduced to Cyprus with the Ottoman conquest in 1571 and became the politically dominant, prestigious language, of the administration. In the post-Ottoman period, Cypriot Turkish was relatively isolated from standard Turkish and had strong influences by the Cypriot Greek dialect. The condition of coexistence with the Greek Cypriots led to a certain bilingualism whereby Turkish Cypriots' knowledge of Greek was important in areas where the two communities lived and worked together.

According to Prof. C. F. Beckingham (1957), in Cyprus religious and linguistic divisions do not always coincide. There were "Turkish", i.e. Muslim villages in which the normal language was Greek. Among them were Lapithiou, Platanisto, Ayios Simeon Beckingham said that this phenomenon has not been adequately investigated.{{sfn|Beckingham|1957|p=166|ps=:In Cyprus religious and linguistic divisions do not quite coincide. While many Turks habitually speak Turkish there are 'Turkish', that is, Muslim villages in which the normal language is Greek; among them are Lapithiou (P i), Platanisso (F i), Ayios Simeon (F i) and Galinoporni (F i). This fact has not yet been adequately investigated. With the growth of national feeling and the spread of education, the phenomenon is becoming not only rarer but harder to detect. In a Muslim village the school teacher will be a Turk and will teach the children Turkish. They already think of themselves as Turks, and having once learnt the language, will sometimes use it in talking to a visitor in preference to Greek, merely as a matter of national pride. On the other hand, many Turks, whose mother tongue is Turkish, learn Greek because they find it useful to understand the language of the majority, though it is much less common for them to write it correctly}} The existence of Greek-speaking Muslims is also mentioned in subsequent works. Ozan Gülle (2014), "it is historically well documented that Turkish Cypriots showed large differences in their frequency of communication in Cypriot Greek [...]: On one end of the spectrum are Turkish Cypriots who were probably monolingual Cypriot Greek speakers or had only little competency in Turkish, ...".

The linguistic situation changed radically in 1974, following the division of Cyprus into a Greek south and a Turkish north. Today, the Cypriot Turkish dialect is being exposed to increasing standard Turkish through immigration from Turkey, new mass media, and new educational institutions. Nonetheless, a Turkish speaker familiar with the Cypriot Turkish variety of Turkish can still easily identify a member of the community from one who is not. Although many Turkish Cypriots command standard Turkish as well, they generally choose to use their own variety in particular contexts to affirm their identity. Most commonly, these differences are in pronunciation, but they extend to lexicon and grammatical structures as well. There are many words used by Turkish Cypriots that originate in the particular historical circumstances of the island, including English and Greek, and therefore have no precedent in standard Turkish. There are also words used by the Turkish Cypriot and Greek Cypriot communities which are authentically Cypriot in origin.

Music and dances

Folk music and dancing is an integral part of social life among Turkish Cypriots. Traditional Turkish Cypriot folk dances can be divided into five categories: Karsilamas, Sirtos, Zeybeks, Ciftetellis/Arabiyes, and Topical Dances (such as Orak, Kozan, Kartal and Topal). The folk dancing groups usually have performances during national festivals, weddings, Turkish nights at hotels and within tourism areas.

Demographics

Debates on the Turkish Cypriot population in the 1970s
The 1960 census of Cyprus reported the Turkish Cypriot population as 18% of the total population. The figure was challenged at in a 1978 debate in the British Parliament when Lord Spens stated that there were 400,000 Turkish Cypriots in Cyprus, at least one-fifth of the population.

2006 Census
According to the 2006 Northern Cyprus Census, there were 145,443 Turkish Cypriots born on the island who were resident in Northern Cyprus (TRNC). Of the Cypriot-born population, 120,007 had both parents born in Cyprus; 12,628 had one of their parents born in Cyprus and the other born in another country. Thus, 132,635 Turkish Cypriots had at least one parent born in Cyprus.

2011 Census
According to the 2011 Northern Cyprus Census, there were 160,207 Turkish Cypriots born on the island who were resident in North Cyprus (TRNC).

Diaspora

There was significant Turkish Cypriot emigration from the island during the nineteenth and twentieth centuries, mainly to Great Britain, Australia, and Turkey. Emigration from Cyprus has mainly been for economical and political reasons. According to the TRNC Ministry of Foreign Affairs, in 2001, 500,000 Turkish Cypriots were living in Turkey; 200,000 in Great Britain; 40,000 in Australia; some 10,000 in North America; and 5,000 in other countries.

A more recent estimate, in 2011, by the Home Affairs Committee states that there are now 300,000 Turkish Cypriots living in the United Kingdom though Turkish Cypriots themselves claim that the British-Turkish Cypriot community has reached 400,000. Furthermore, recent estimates suggest that there are between 60,000 and 120,000 Turkish Cypriots living in Australia, 5,000 in the United States, 2,000 in Germany, 1,800 in Canada, 1,600 in New Zealand, and a smaller community in South Africa.

Turkey

The first mass migration of Turkish Cypriots to Turkey occurred in 1878 when the Ottoman Empire leased Cyprus to Great Britain. The flow of Turkish Cypriot emigration to Turkey continued in the aftermath of the First World War, and gained its greatest velocity in the mid-1920s. Economic motives played an important part of the continued migration to Turkey because conditions for the poor in Cyprus during the 1920s were especially harsh. Thereafter, Turkish Cypriots continued to migrate to Turkey during the Second World War in the 1940s and during the Cyprus conflict of the 1960s and 1970s.

Initially, enthusiasm to emigrate to Turkey was inflated by the euphoria that greeted the birth of the newly established Republic of Turkey and later of promises of assistance to Turks who emigrated. A decision taken by the Turkish Government at the end of 1925, for instance, noted that the Turks of Cyprus had, according to the Treaty of Lausanne, the right to emigrate to the republic, and therefore, families that so emigrated would be given a house and sufficient land. The precise number of those who emigrated to Turkey is a matter that remains unknown. The press in Turkey reported in mid-1927 that of those who had opted for Turkish nationality, 5,000–6,000 Turkish Cypriots had already settled in Turkey. However, many Turkish Cypriots had already emigrated even before the rights accorded to them under the Treaty of Lausanne had come into force.

Metin Heper and Bilge Criss have summarized the migration of the late nineteenth and early twentieth century as follows:

St. John-Jones has analyzed the migration of Turkish Cypriots during early British rule further:

The Turkish Cypriot population in Turkey continued to increase at fluctuating speeds as a result of the Second World War (1939–1945). According to Ali Suat Bilge, taking into consideration the mass migrations of 1878, the First World War, the 1920s early Turkish Republican era, and the Second World War, overall, a total of approximately 100,000 Turkish Cypriots had left the island for Turkey between 1878 and 1945. By 31 August 1955, a statement by Turkey's Minister of State and Acting Foreign Minister, Fatin Rüştü Zorlu, at the London Conference on Cyprus, estimated that the total Turkish Cypriot population (including descendants) in Turkey had reached 300,000: 

By 2001 the TRNC Ministry of Foreign Affairs estimated that 500,000 Turkish Cypriots were living in Turkey.

Palestine
Turkish Cypriots who remained in Cyprus during the early twentieth century were faced with the harsh economic conditions of the Great Depression under British rule. Consequently, many families in the poorest villages, facing debt and starvation, married off their daughters to Arabs mainly in British Palestine, and other Arab countries, in the hope that they would have a better life. A bride price was normally given by the groom to the family of the girls, usually about £10-20, enough to buy several acres of land at the time, as part of the marriage arrangements.. Such payments had not been part of Cypriot tradition, and Cypriots typically describe the girls in these forced marriages as having been "sold"; Arabs however, often object to this characterization. Mostly between the ages of 11–18, the majority of the girls lost contact with their families in Cyprus, and while some had successful marriages and families, others found themselves little more than domestic servants, abused, or ended up working in brothels.

The marriages were sometimes arranged by brokers, who presented the prospective husbands as wealthy doctors and engineers. However, Neriman Cahit, in her book Brides for Sale, found that in reality many of these men had mediocre jobs or were already married with children. Unaware of these realities, Turkish Cypriot families continued to send their daughters to Palestine until the 1950s. Cahit estimates that within 30 years up to 4,000 Turkish Cypriot women were sent to Palestine to be married to Arab men.

In recent years second and third generation Palestinians of Turkish Cypriot origin have been applying for Cypriot citizenship; several hundred Palestinians have already been successful in obtaining Cypriot passports.

In 2012 Yeliz Shukri and Stavros Papageorghiou secured financial support for the making of a film on the subject of the "Forgotten Brides". The documentary, entitled Missing Fetine, was released in 2018, and follows the search of Australian-born Turkish Cypriot Pembe Mentesh for her long-lost great-aunt, while investigating the fate of these Turkish Cypriot women.

United Kingdom

Turkish Cypriot migration to the United Kingdom began in the early 1920s, the British Empire having formally annexed Cyprus in 1914, with the residents of British-ruled Cyprus becoming subjects of the Crown. Some arrived as students and tourists, while others left the island due to the harsh economic and political life during the British colony of Cyprus. Emigration to the United Kingdom continued to increase when the Great Depression of 1929 brought economic depression to Cyprus, with unemployment and low wages being a significant issue. During the Second World War, the number of Turkish run cafes increased from 20 in 1939 to 200 in 1945 which created a demand for more Turkish Cypriot workers. Throughout the 1950s, Turkish Cypriots emigrated for economic reasons and by 1958 their number was estimated to be 8,500. Their numbers continued to increase each year as rumours about immigration restrictions appeared in much of the Cypriot media.

The 1950s also saw the arrival of many Turkish Cypriots to the United Kingdom due to political reasons; many began to flee as a result of the EOKA struggle and its aim of "enosis". Once the ethnic cleansing broke out in 1963, and some 25,000 Turkish Cypriots became internally displaced, accounting to about a fifth of their population. The political and economic unrest in Cyprus, after 1964, sharply increased the number of Turkish Cypriot immigrants to the United Kingdom. Many of these early migrants worked in the clothing industry in London, where both men and women could work together; many worked in the textile industry as sewing was a skill which the community had already acquired in Cyprus. Turkish Cypriots were concentrated mainly in the north-east of London and specialised in the heavy-wear sector, such as coats and tailored garments. This sector offered work opportunities where poor knowledge of the English language was not a problem and where self-employment was a possibility.

Once the Turkish Cypriots declared their own state, the Turkish Republic of Northern Cyprus, the division of the island led to an economic embargo against the Turkish Cypriots by the Greek Cypriot controlled Republic of Cyprus. This had the effect of depriving the Turkish Cypriots of foreign investment, aid and export markets; thus, it caused the Turkish Cypriot economy to remain stagnant and undeveloped. Due to these economic and political issues, an estimated 130,000 Turkish Cypriots have emigrated from Northern Cyprus since its establishment to the United Kingdom.
Origins
Turkish Cypriots are of diverse origins. They mainly descend from Turkified native Cypriots, Anatolian migrants following the Ottoman conquest, and several Turkoman tribes that were exiled to the island, especially during the late 17th and early 18th centuries. Though, the island also received migration from Egypt and Anatolia in pre-Ottoman times.
Genetic studies

According to genetic studies, there are close connections between modern Anatolian and Cypriot populations. A 2016 study, which focused on patrilineal ancestry, found that among the sampled Near Eastern and Southeastern European populations, Turkish Cypriots had the shortest genetic distances with those from Cyprus, Turkey, Lebanon, Greece, and Sicily.

A 2017 study found that both Turkish Cypriots' and Greek Cypriots' patrilineal ancestry derives primarily from a single pre-Ottoman local gene pool. The frequency of total haplotypes shared between Turkish and Greek Cypriots is 7-8%, with analysis showing that none of these are found in Turkey, thus not supporting a Turkish origin for the shared haplotypes. No shared haplotypes were observed between Greek Cypriots and mainland Turkish populations, while total haplotypes shared between Turkish Cypriots and mainland Turks is 3%. Turkish Cypriots also share haplotypes with North Africans to a lesser extent, and have Eastern Eurasian haplogroups (H, C, N, O, Q) – attributed to the arrival of the Ottomans – at a frequency of ~5.5%. Both Cypriot groups show close genetic affinity to Calabrian (southern Italy) and Lebanese patrilineages. The study states that the genetic affinity between Calabrians and Cypriots can be explained as a result of a common ancient Greek (Achaean) genetic contribution, while Lebanese affinity can be explained through several migrations that took place from coastal Levant to Cyprus from the Neolithic (early farmers), the Iron Age (Phoenicians), and the Middle Ages (Maronites and other Levantine settlers during the Frankish era). The predominant haplogroups among both Turkish and Greek Cypriots are J2a-M410, E-M78, and G2-P287.

In a 2019 genome-wide study, Cypriot samples grouped with people from the Levant (Druze, Lebanese and Syrians) and Armenia among the sampled populations from Eurasia and Africa, using cluster analysis based on haplotype-sharing patterns.

Homozygous beta thalassemia in a number of at-risk populations (Greek and Turkish Cypriots, Greeks, Continental Italians and Sardinians) has been prevented at the population level by programmes based on carrier screening, genetic counselling and prenatal diagnosis.

Notable Turkish Cypriots

In Cyprus

In the diaspora

Parliamentary Assembly of the Council of Europe
Turkish Cypriot representatives of Parliamentary Assembly of the Council of Europe (PACE) elected in the Assembly of 1960 partnership government: 1961–1964: Halit Ali Riza, 1961–1963: Umit Suleyman,
1963–1964: Burhan Nalbantoglu.

Turkish Cypriot representatives of PACE elected in the Assembly of Northern Cyprus: 
(TCs have 2 seats in PACE; the parties of elected members are shown) 2005–2007: CTP Özdil Nami; UBP Hüseyin Özgürgün; 27.01.2011 CTP Mehmet Caglar; UBP Ahmet Eti; 04.12.2013 CTP Mehmet Caglar, UBP Tahsin Ertuğruloğlu

See also
 Turkish Cypriot diaspora
 Northern Cypriot passport
 List of Turkish Cypriots 
 List of Cypriots 
 Cypriot refugees
 Turkish minorities in the former Ottoman Empire, neighbouring communities:
Turkish Bulgarians
Turkish Egyptians
Turkish Iraqis 
Turkish Lebanese
Turkish Meskhetians 
Turkish Syrians 
Turkish Western Thracians

Notes

References

Bibliography

 .
 . 
.
 .
 .
 .
.
.
 .
.
.
.
.
.
.
 .
 .
.
.
.

 .
.
.
.
 .

.
.
.
.
.
.
.
.

.
.
.
.
.
.
.
.
.
 .
.
.
.
.
.
.
.
.
 
.
.
 
.
.

 .
.

.

Further reading

 Baybars, Taner, Plucked in a far-off land, London: Victor Gollancz, 1970.
 Beckingham, C. F., The Cypriot Turks, Journal of the Royal Central Asian Society, vol. 43, pp. 126–30, 1956.
 Beckingham, C. F., The Turks of Cyprus, Journal of the Royal Anthropological Institute of Great Britain and Ireland. vol 87(II), pp. 165–74. July–Dec. 1957.
 Beckingham, C. F., Islam and Turkish nationalism in Cyprus, Die Welt des Islam, NS, Vol 5, 65–83, 1957.
 Committee on Turkish Affairs, An investigation into matters concerning and affecting the Turkish community in Cyprus: Interim report, Nicosia: Government Printing Office, 1949.
 Dandini, Jerome. Voyage du Mont Liban / traduit de l'Italien du R. P. Jerome Dandini ... Ou il est traité tant de la créance ... des Maronites, que des plusieurs particularitez touchant les Turcs ... avec des remarques sur la theologie des chrétiens & ... des mahometans. Par R. S. P. Jennings, Ronald C., Christians and Muslims in Ottoman Cyprus and the Mediterranean World, 1571–1640, New York University Studies in Near Eastern Civilization-Number XVIII, New York University Press, New York and London, 1993-Acknowledgments ix–xi + 428 pp.
 Oakley, Robin, The Turkish peoples of Cyprus, in Margaret Bainbridge, ed, The Turkic peoples of the world. (pp. 85–117), New York: Kegan Paul, 1993
 Xypolia, Ilia, British Imperialism and Turkish Nationalism in Cyprus, 1923–1939: Divide, Define and Rule, London: Routledge, 2011.
 Winbladh, M.-L.,The Origins of The Cypriots. With Scientific Data of Archaeology and Genetics,'' Galeri Kültür, Lefkoşa 2020, Cyprus
 Winbladh, M.-L., Adventures of an archaeologist. Memoirs of a museum curator, AKAKIA Publications, London 2020

External links

 Cezire Association – Researchers of Turkish Cypriot history and culture
 Historical Origins of Turkish Cypriot People
 Oral histories of Turkish Cypriots in Britain
 History of Turkish Cypriots in Britain
 Reassessing what we collect website – Turkish Cypriot London History of Turkish Cypriot London with objects and images
 Turkish Cypriots of Australia – Historical Book
 North Cyprus Turkish Youth Club of Victoria
 Association of Turkish Cypriots Abroad
 Turkish Cypriot Lobby Group in the UK
 North Cyprus Turkish Community Centre of Victoria

 
Turkish
Cypriots
Muslim communities in Europe